"Never Left" is a song by American rapper Lil Tecca, released on May 6, 2021, as the lead single from his second studio album We Love You Tecca 2 (2021). The track was produced by ThankYouWill, Taz Taylor, and Cxdy.

Critical reception 
Mitch Findlay of HotNewHipHop wrote that although the track was "not quite as immediately accessible as some of Tecca's previous work", he complimented Tecca's "melodic instincts" as "sharp".

Charts

Certifications

References

Songs written by Lil Tecca
2021 songs
2021 singles
Lil Tecca songs
Song recordings produced by Taz Taylor (record producer)
Songs written by Taz Taylor (record producer)